The 1996 Lindsay by-election was held in the Australian electorate of Lindsay in New South Wales on 19 October 1996. The by-election was triggered by a ruling of the Court of Disputed Returns that the election of the Liberal Party candidate Jackie Kelly was invalid, due to her citizenship status and employment by the Royal Australian Air Force. The writ for the by-election was issued on 16 September 1996.

Background
Jackie Kelly won the seat of Lindsay from Labor's Ross Free at the 1996 federal election – a surprise win as Lindsay was considered a safe Labor seat. However, Kelly's election was challenged on two counts: that she had not renounced her New Zealand citizenship (Section 44 of the Australian Constitution states that "a subject or citizen of a foreign power" is ineligible to stand for federal parliament), and that at the time of her nomination as a candidate she was employed as a legal officer for the Royal Australian Air Force (s. 44  also prohibits any person who "holds any office of profit under the Crown" from election to parliament). The Court of Disputed Returns ruled on 11 September 1996 that Kelly's election was indeed constitutionally invalid, and a by-election was called several days later. Kelly, by this time, had resigned from the RAAF and renounced her New Zealand citizenship, and was eligible to stand as a candidate in the by-election.

Results

Aftermath
Jackie Kelly won the by-election with an even larger majority – a swing of 4.97% in her favour.

See also
 List of Australian federal by-elections

References

External links
Lindsay (NSW) By-Election (19 October 1996), Australian Electoral Commission

1996 elections in Australia
New South Wales federal by-elections